Think of a Number is the debut novel of John Verdon published in 2010.

It is a detective novel about a retired New York City homicide detective named Dave Gurney.

It is the beginning of a saga that continues with its 2011 follow-up Shut Your Eyes Tight.

In 2012 a third novel in the David Gurney series was published, entitled Let the Devil Sleep.

In 2014 a fourth novel in the David Gurney series was published, entitled Peter Pan Must Die

See also
2010 in literature
 Greek edition's page for Think of a Number (Σκέψου έναν Αριθμό)

References

2010 American novels
American detective novels
Novels set in New York City
2010 debut novels
Crown Publishing Group books